The All-Japan Rugby Football Championship (日本ラグビーフットボール選手権大会 Nihon Ragubi- Futtobo-ru Senshuken Taikai) is played at the end of the season and is doubling as the title playoff in the Top League. The first championship was played in 1963 and won by Doshisha University RFC which beat Kintetsu (now Kintetsu Liners) 18–3. Before that the NHK invitation cup was played three times, 1960-2.

Qualifying

2009–2017 
The All-Japan Rugby Football Championship was expanded from 8 to 10 teams for 2009 with the addition of two more Top League sides. For 2010, the top four Top League sides automatically qualify for the Championship, while the six sides that finish fifth to tenth play off to determine the last two Top League sides.

2017–present 
With the new Top League system, the teams in the title playoff will have this playoff double as this competition. No university teams will compete.

NHK Cup Finals

All Japan Rugby Football Championship finals

See also 
 Rugby union in Japan

References 

 
Rugby union competitions in Japan
Recurring sporting events established in 1963
1963 establishments in Japan
Annual sporting events in Japan
National championships in Japan